Richard "Dick" Wayne Howard (August 22, 1935 – November 9, 1967) was an American athlete who competed mainly in the 400 metre hurdles.

He competed for the United States in the 1960 Summer Olympics held in Rome, Italy, where he won the bronze medal in the 400 metre hurdles.  Running for the University of New Mexico, he was the 1959 NCAA Champion at 440 yard hurdles, the first time the event was held.

Howard died of a heroin overdose in 1967.

References

Wallechinsky, David and Jaime Loucky (2008). "Track and Field (Men): 400-Meter Hurdles". In The Complete Book of the Olympics - 2008 Edition. London: Aurum Press Limited. p. 163.

External links 
 

1935 births
1967 deaths
American male hurdlers
Athletes (track and field) at the 1960 Summer Olympics
Deaths by heroin overdose in the United States
Olympic bronze medalists for the United States in track and field
Medalists at the 1960 Summer Olympics
New Mexico Lobos men's track and field athletes
Pan American Games silver medalists for the United States
Pan American Games medalists in athletics (track and field)
Athletes (track and field) at the 1959 Pan American Games
Medalists at the 1959 Pan American Games